The British Open is a professional snooker tournament, held as a ranking tournament from 1985. The tournament had not been held since the 2004/2005 season, until the 2021/2022 season when it was confirmed as returning to the calendar after 17 years.

The tournament had various sponsors and venues over the years. It took place around November each year. Prior to the 1999/2000 season, it was held later in the season. As a result, two tournaments were held in 1999, one for the 1998/1999 season and one for the 1999/2000 season.

The reigning (2022) champion is Welshman Ryan Day who defeated Northern Irishman Mark Allen to take his first title. The record for the most titles is held by Englishman Steve Davis with five, one ahead of Scots Stephen Hendry and John Higgins.

History 
The tournament began in 1980 as the British Gold Cup in the Assembly Rooms, Derby. It was a sixteen-man invitation event and was played on a round robin basis with the group winners advancing to the semi-finals. The next year Yamaha took over sponsorship and the tournament was renamed the Yamaha Organs Trophy. The next year the tournaments name was changed to International Masters. The top eight of the first round robin stage played in two further groups and the winners advanced to the final. For 1984 the field of the tournament was increased to 27 and nine three-man groups were organised. The winners played in three semi-final groups and the winners played in a three-man round robin final.

After WPBSA decided to increase the number of ranking events in 1984/1985 and Yamaha withdrew its sponsorship the event was renamed the British Open. Dulux was the sponsor of the event between 1985 and 1987. In the next six years the event had four different sponsors: MIM Britannia Unit Trusts in 1988, Anglian Windows in 1989, Pearl Assurance between 1990 and 1992, and Wickes Home Improvements in 1993. In 1990 FA Cup style draws were introduced from the last 32 stage of the event.

In 1994 the tournament was moved to the Plymouth Pavilions. Between 1994 and 2004 the event was sponsored in only three years by Castella in 1995 and 1996, and by Stan James in 2001. The event was moved to the first half of the calendar in 1999/2000. The event than moved to the Telewest Arena in Newcastle for 2001, the Telford International Centre for 2002 and the Brighton Centre for 2003 and 2004. The event was dropped from the calendar in 2005/2006.

There have been seven maximum breaks during the history of the tournament. James Wattana made the first in 1992 in the last 16 against Tony Drago. The second and third came at the qualifying stage of the event. David McDonnell compiled it in the fourth round of the 1995 event against Nic Barrow and Jason Prince in the fifth round of the first 1999 event against Ian Brumby. Graeme Dott made the fourth at the same event in the last 64 against David Roe. The fifth was Stephen Hendry's sixth official maximum break, which he compiled in the final of the second 1999 event against Peter Ebdon. The revived 2021 event recorded two maximum breaks. John Higgins made one in the first frame of his first-round win over Alexander Ursenbacher, while Ali Carter made his during the second frame of his fourth-round match against Elliot Slessor.

Winners

Notes

References

 
Recurring sporting events established in 1980
Recurring sporting events disestablished in 2004
1980 establishments in England
2004 disestablishments in England
Snooker non-ranking competitions
Snooker ranking tournaments
Sport in Brighton and Hove
Snooker competitions in England